Uchida Kakichi (内田 嘉吉, 	18 November 1866 – 3 January 1933) was the 9th Governor-General of Taiwan from 6 September 1923 to September 1924. Prior to assuming the office of Governor-General, Uchida also served as Chief of Home Affairs under Governors-General Sakuma Samata and Ando Sadami, the second highest position in the colonial government.

See also
 Taiwan under Japanese rule

References 

Governors-General of Taiwan
1866 births
1933 deaths